The Outfield were an English rock band based in London. The band achieved success in the mid-1980s and are best remembered for their hit single, "Your Love". The band's lineup consisted of guitarist John Spinks, vocalist and bassist Tony Lewis, and drummer Alan Jackman.

They had an unusual experience for a British band in that they enjoyed commercial success in the US, but never in their homeland. The band began recording during the mid-1980s, and released their first album, Play Deep, in 1985 through Columbia Records. The album reached No. 9 on the Billboard 200 list and then reached triple platinum in the United States. The band's single "Your Love" reached No. 6 on the Billboard Hot 100 as well as No. 7 on the Mainstream Rock chart, and it became their signature song. The band continued to record and tour through the 1980s and then into the early 1990s. While subsequent albums Bangin' (1987) and Voices of Babylon (1989) saw some chart successes, the group's popularity waned.

Drummer Alan Jackman left and now as a duo, they recorded Diamond Days in 1991. After the disappointing response to their 1992 album Rockeye, which represented a shift towards progressive rock and arena rock, the group essentially disbanded in the 1990s. They resumed touring in 1998, and thereafter released two live albums via their website, along with a new studio album, Any Time Now in 2004, which was later re-released in 2006. In 2011, the band released their final album, Replay, with original drummer Alan Jackman re-joining the band. Spinks died in 2014 after which the group officially disbanded. On 22 March 2018, lead singer/bassist Tony Lewis announced a solo album called Out of the Darkness, which was released on 29 June 2018 through Madison Records. Lewis died on October 19, 2020, aged 62.

History

Formation and commercial success (1984–1986)
Bassist/singer Tony Lewis, guitarist/keyboardist and songwriter John Spinks and drummer Alan Jackman played together in the late 1970s in a straightforward power pop band called Sirius B. After rehearsing for about six months and playing several gigs, their style did not match the punk rock that was surging in popularity in England and they broke up. Several years afterward, the three gathered back together in London's East End under the name the Baseball Boys. They performed in and around England until a demo got them signed to Columbia/CBS Records in 1984.

Spinks adopted the name 'Baseball Boys' from a teen gang called "The Baseball Furies" in the cult film The Warriors, a movie that he had just seen. Although he used the name as a joke and "just to be outrageous", record company people responded favourably. The band got a reputation as a very "American-sounding" group and signed in the US after playing for just a few months in England. Their manager, an American living in England, recommended a new band name with a similar attitude since 'Baseball Boys' seemed too "tacky" and "tongue-in-cheek". Spinks has said, "The Outfield was the most left-wing kind of thing we liked."

Spinks expressed an interest in the American sport of baseball, while also being a devoted fan of association football. He claimed that the group "didn't know what an outfield was" until they visited the U.S., and that, "We're just learning about baseball. It's an acquired taste and we're trying to acquire a taste for it." He expounded upon this in a Chicago Tribune piece:

Play Deep
Their debut album, Play Deep produced by William Wittman, was issued in 1985 and was a success. The album reached triple platinum sales status and the top 10 in the US album charts; it also featured a top 10 single entry with "Your Love", which peaked at No. 6. It went on to be featured in a number of 80s-themed compilation albums, and over 1,000 covers and remixes by other artists have been released physically and/or online. The band toured extensively, opening for Journey and Starship. Spinks made a point of mentioning in interviews that the band was "totally into not smoking or doing drugs".

Bangin’
1987 saw the release of their second album, Bangin'.  This album did not achieve the acclaim of Play Deep, but it did spawn a top 40 single, "Since You've Been Gone" (not to be confused with the 1970s Rainbow and Head East hit of the same name), which also hit No. 11 on the Billboard Mainstream Rock Songs chart.  Furthermore, they had a minor radio/MTV hit with "No Surrender". The album sold reasonably well and was certified gold in the United States. A US summer tour opening for Night Ranger followed.

Voices of Babylon
For the group's third album, 1989's Voices of Babylon, a new producer (David Kahne) and sound was evident.  The title track was a top 25 single and hit No. 2 on the Billboard Mainstream Rock Songs chart. The follow-up song, "My Paradise", was a mid-sized album-rock hit reaching No. 34 on the Billboard Mainstream Rock Songs chart, but overall the group's popularity continued to decline.

Diamond Days
After the Babylon LP, Alan Jackman parted ways with the band and was replaced for a concert tour by Paul Read. Spinks and Lewis continued as a duo, switched labels and began recording Diamond Days for MCA. Playing drums on the disc was session drummer Simon Dawson. The LP, released in 1990, produced a top 30 US hit, "For You". Quick to follow was "One Hot Country", included on the soundtrack to the 1991 action film If Looks Could Kill.

Later years and aftermath
The Outfield returned with 1992's Rockeye. Its leadoff single, "Closer to Me", was a near top 40 hit, and a second release, "Winning It All", gained some notice due to extensive play during NBC's NBA Finals coverage, the NBA Superstars series featuring Larry Bird, the 1992 Summer Olympics, Chicago Bulls championship ring ceremonies and the film The Mighty Ducks. Simon Dawson, who played on Rockeye, would eventually become the band's official third member. The band took an extended hiatus during the mid-1990s as changing musical fashions, especially the popularity of edgier bands such as Nirvana and Pearl Jam, made life difficult for older bands with a less fashionable aesthetic.

The Outfield returned to their East End roots, and often played low-key gigs at a local pub, where much of the clientele were unaware that the group had sold millions of records in the US. Unfortunately, this situation was typical of the problems the Outfield had faced in their homeland: little recognition and a much smaller following than they had experienced in the US.  Nevertheless, the band would reappear with a fan-club-only release, entitled It Ain't Over..., and resume touring. Soon thereafter, in 1999, they released Extra Innings, an odds-and-ends compilation of new and older, unreleased songs.

In the early 2000s, the band issued two live collections via their official website: Live in Brazil and The Outfield Live. In 2004, the band released Any Time Now, a new studio album, through Tower Records, and later released a new version of the album in March 2006 through Sidewinder Records.

In 2009, the original line up of John Spinks, Tony Lewis and Alan Jackman returned to a London recording studio to record their first album together since Voices of Babylon was recorded in 1988.  In addition, the Outfield announced Brent Bitner had taken over the band's management and launched their official Facebook, Twitter, YouTube and Myspace pages in November 2009.  On 22 March 2011, the Outfield announced that their upcoming album would be called Replay. Replay was recorded in various studios in the south of England that included production work at the legendary Abbey Road Studios. Replay was produced by the Outfield and Brent Bitner with executive production by John Spinks. On 28 June 2011, Replay was released to rave reviews. The lead single, "California Sun", was a regional number one AOR chart hit and has subsequently been the second most added song on AC radio as of 15 August 2011. A limited advanced release of the band's possible second single, "A Long, Long Time Ago", reached number one on Worldwide FM ClassX Radio's AOR chart in the second week of August 2011.

In 2013, the band rerecorded vocals to their single "Your Love" to be incorporated into American DJ Morgan Page's reworking of the song, which was released in the summer of that year. Though credited to Page, the single was listed as featuring the Outfield.

On 9 July 2014, John Spinks died of liver cancer. He was 60 years old.

After taking a few years off from music, lead singer/bassist Tony Lewis announced his return with a solo album, Out of the Darkness, which was released on 29 June 2018 through Madison Records and with the help of his wife Carol and their collaborative songwriting.

On 19 October 2020, singer Tony Lewis died suddenly and unexpectedly at his home near London.

Style and influences
The Outfield were considered a pop rock, power pop, or a new wave group. Annelise Wamsley of the Tampa Bay Times described the band's style in 1987: "the Outfield specializes in what you could call an early '80s American Sound. It's music by recipe: You to take hyper-macho hard rock and tone it down so it will appeal to the over-17 set. You need a simple hook that can be repeated a dozen or so times, lots of electric guitar solos, a standard rock beat and basic lyrics." John Spinks said in 1986 interview with the Los Angeles Times that he was very influenced by "the music that gives me a rush" and that he "grew up on the Beatles". Interestingly, it was also said that the band wanted to be a "car stereo sort of poppy version of the band Rush. "61 Seconds and "Mystery Man" are evidence of this. He also cited contemporaries Journey, Foreigner, and Mr. Mister – particularly the latter's hit "Broken Wings". In that interview, he expanded upon the band's strong foundation in melody:

Wamsely made a similar remark, writing, "This is the stuff people listen to in their cars, on the way to work or play at high school dances."

Criticism often centered on their generic sound. "The music is hopelessly, numbingly derivative of just about every Journey/Foreigner/Cars cliché in the book — with none of the style that makes those bands special," said Matt Damsker, rock critic for the Hartford Courant.

Members

Final known lineup
Tony Lewis – vocals, bass guitar (1984–2014; died 2020)
John Spinks – guitar, keyboards, vocals (1984–2014; died 2014)
Alan Jackman – drums, percussion (1984–1989, 2009–2014)

Former member
Simon Dawson – drums (1989–2009)

Discography

Studio albums

Compilations 
Playing the Field (1992)
Big Innings: The Best of The Outfield (1996)
Super Hits (1998)
Demo and Rarities (2010)
Playlist: The Very Best of The Outfield (2011)
The Baseball Boys: Early Demos and Rare Tracks (2020)
Final Innings (2021)

Live albums
Live in Brazil (2001)
The Outfield Live (2005)

Singles

Featured singles

Music videos

References

External links

Tony Lewis's official website
The Outfield at AllMusic
The Outfield at Legacy Recordings
 
 The Outfield at 45cat.com

 
English pop rock music groups
English new wave musical groups
English power pop groups
Musical groups from London
Musical groups established in 1983
Musical groups disestablished in 2014
Columbia Records artists
MCA Records artists
1983 establishments in England
2014 disestablishments in England
Second British Invasion artists